Di Mana Melani is an Indonesian TV Serial airs on SCTV and produced by MD Entertainment. This serial is related in the Chilean TV Series "¿Dónde Está Elisa?".

Cast
 Estelle Linden as Melani Wirayuda
 Kiki Farrel as Pasya Utama
 Donny Michael as Angga Permana
 Shandy Ishabella as Weni Permana
 Irish Bella as Serena Wirayuda
 Kesha Ratuliu as Nadya Wirayuda
 Vira Yuniar as Arini Wirayuda
 Gunawan Sudradjat as Chandra Wirayuda
 Caroline Zachrie as Fryda Wirayuda
 Ferry Salim as Jamal Permana
 Lyra Virna as Lisa Wirayuda
 Yoppie Andreas as Nugraha Utama
 Restu Sinaga as Donny Pamungkas
 Johan Morgan Purba as Rio Fabian
 Fadlan Muhammad as Daniel Adirangga
 Diana Puspita as Linda
 Uli Auliani as Juwita Puspitarini

External links
 Dimana Melani?

Indonesian television series